Punkin Center is a small, rural unincorporated community in Lincoln County, Colorado, United States, located at the junction of State Highway 94 and State Highway 71.

Description
John Stevens built the first store at the farmers crossroads in 1920. He painted each new building a pumpkin color, inspiring the name. Everything burned in the 1950s. Its mostly white population was 4 according to a Denver Post article. The Post Offices at Hugo (ZIP Code 80821) and Ordway (ZIP 81063) serve Punkin Center postal addresses.

See also

References

External links

Unincorporated communities in Lincoln County, Colorado
Unincorporated communities in Colorado